Lorne Gillean Iain Maclaine of Lochbuie (born 1945) is the 26th hereditary chief of Clan Maclaine of Lochbuie and feudal baron of Moy. He is the son of Captain Gillean Robert Maclaine, 25th of Lochbuie, and Noreen Olive Beadon. He currently resides in KwaZulu-Natal, South Africa, with his wife Sandra, Lady Lochbuie.

References

Scottish clan chiefs
Living people
1945 births